is the 48th single by AKB48, released on May 31, 2017. The title song was first performed live on NCON, a traditional school choir contest promoted by NHK, and later on other shows Minna no Uta and AKB48 Show where this song made their its TV appearances.

The single was number-one on the Oricon weekly Singles Chart, with 1,305,747 copies sold, and was also number-one the Billboard Japan Hot 100.

Abstract 
The song is reminiscent of Russian folk songs, and moves at an almost waltzing tempo.

An original song performed by STU48, "Setouchi no Koe", was included as coupling song, however, as the Theater Edition does not come with bonus DVD included, the full MV was released on the official STU48 channel and later included in the bonus disc from debut single "Kurayami".

Release and promotion
This single will be released in seven versions: three limited editions (Types A, B and C), three regular editions (Types A, B and C) and Theater edition.

For this single, Jurina Matsui & Sakura Miyawaki will serve as double center.

Two versions of music video (Short and Full) were released on AKB48 official channel on May 2, 2017. The Full MV lasts 11 minutes and 6 seconds, marking the third longest AKB48 A-Side music video released on YouTube ("Bokutachi wa Tatakawanai" music video has 11'54", and "Kuchibiru ni Be My Baby" has 13'05"). Due to the length, PlayTV only aired the short version (instead of full version) on Interferência Ichiban on May 8, 2017. This is the first single to release after Kojima Haruna graduated from the group.

Track listing

Type A

Type B

Type C

Theater Edition

Release history

Personnel
The performers for the main single "Negaigoto no Mochigusare" are:
 AKB48 Team A: Anna Iriyama,  Shizuka Oya, Yui Yokoyama
 AKB48 Team K: Minami Minegishi, Mion Mukaichi, Tomu Muto
 AKB48 Team B: Yuki Kashiwagi, Rena Kato, Yuria Kizaki, Mayu Watanabe
 AKB48 Team 4: Nana Okada, Saya Kawamoto, Mako Kojima, Haruka Komiyama, Juri Takahashi
 AKB48 Team 8: Yui Oguri, Erina Oda
 AKB48 Kenkyuusei: Satone Kubo
 SKE48 Team S: Jurina Matsui
 SKE48 Team KII: Akane Takayanagi, Nao Furuhata
 NMB48 Team N: Miori Ichikawa, Ayaka Yamamoto, Sayaka Yamamoto
 NMB48 Team M: Miru Shiroma, Akari Yoshida
 HKT48 Team H: Haruka Kodama, Rino Sashihara
 HKT48 Team KIV: Mio Tomonaga, Sakura Miyawaki
 HKT48 Team TII: Hana Matsuoka
 NGT48 Team NIII: Rie Kitahara, Rika Nakai

"Ima Para"
(25 Members)  Rino Sashihara Center

Team A: Miyazaki Miho

Team 4: Nana Okada

Team 8: Onishi Momoka, Sato Nanami

AKB48 Kenkyuusei: Asai Nanami

Team KII: Mina Oba, Soda Sarina, Hidaka Yuzuki

Team E: Kimoto Kanon, Kumazaki Haruka, Goto Rara, Sato Sumire, Akari Suda, Marika Tani

Team N: Ririka Suto

Team BII: Yuuri Ota

Team H: Sashihara Rino, Yabuki Nako

Team KIV: Ueki Nao, Tomiyoshi Asuka, Murashige Anna, Motomura Aoi

Team NIII: Yuka Ogino, Kitahara Rie, Rika Nakai

"Maebure"
(22 Members) (Mayu Watanabe Center)

Team A: Hiwatashi Yui

Team B: Fukuoka Seina, Ma Chia-ling, Watanabe Mayu

Team 4: Saya Kawamoto, Mako Kojima, Haruka Komiyama

Team 8: Yui Oguri, Nagisa Sakaguchi

AKB48 Kenkyuusei: Kubo Satone, Manaka Taguchi, Erī Chiba

Team S: Ryoha Kitagawa

Team KII: Ego Yuna, Obata Yuna, Takeuchi Saki

Team H: Tashima Meru,  Miku Tanaka

Team KIV: Mio Tomonaga, Miyawaki Sakura

Team TII: Hana Matsuoka

Team NIII: Moeka Takakura

"Tenmetsu Pheromone"
(21 Members) (Jurina Matsui Center)

Team A: Megu Taniguchi

Team K: Yuka Tano, Mion Mukaichi, Tomu Muto, Mogi Shinobu

Team B: Kizaki Yuria, Moe Goto

Team 4: Juri Takahashi

Team 8: Okabe Rin, Kuranoo Narumi, Yamada Nanami

AKB48 Kenkyuusei: Yamauchi Mizuki

Team S: Matsui Jurina, Suzuran Yamauchi

Team N: Yamamoto Ayaka

Team M: Miru Shiroma

Team BII: Okita Ayaka

Team H: Yuka Akiyoshi, Inoue Yuriya, Matsuoka Natsumi

Team NIII: Minami Kato

"Ano Koro no Gohyaku Yen Dama"
(21 Members) (Yamamoto Sayaka Center)

Team A: Anna Iriyama, Yukari Sasaki, Yokoyama Yui

Team K: Minegishi Minami

Team B: Kashiwagi Yuki, Kato Rena

Team 4: Saho Iwatate, Omori Miyuu

Team S: Futamura Haruka

Team KII: Akane Takayanagi, Nao Furuhata

Team E: Kamata Natsuki

Team N: Yamamoto Sayaka

Team M: Nagisa Shibuya, Akari Yoshida

Team BII: Fuuko Yagura

Team H: Yui Kojina, Komada Hiroka, Sakaguchi Riko

Team KIV: Fuchigami Mai, Moriyasu Madoka

"Setouchi no Koe"
STU48 Senbatsu (16 Members) (Yumiko Takino Center)

STU48 1st Generation: Isogai Kanon, Ichioka Ayumi, Iwata Hina, Okada Nana, Ozaki Mami, Kadota Momona, Sashihara Rino, Takino Yumiko, Taniguchi Mahina, Cho Orie, Torobu Yuri, Fukuda Akari, Fujiwara Azusa, Mishima Haruka, Mori Kaho, Yabushita Fu

References

AKB48 songs
2017 singles
2017 songs
Songs with lyrics by Yasushi Akimoto
King Records (Japan) singles
Oricon Weekly number-one singles
Billboard Japan Hot 100 number-one singles